The National Basketball League's Best Team Free Throws honour is awarded annually to the National Basketball League (NBL) team with the best free throw percentage during the regular season. It was first awarded in the league's inaugural season in 1982. The award went on a three-year hiatus between 2019 and 2021, before being brought back in 2022. The winning team receives the Nial Forsyth Trophy.

Winners

See also
 List of National Basketball League (New Zealand) awards

References

Awards established in 1982
B
1982 establishments in New Zealand